Oscar Wiesel (20 August 1864 in Saint-Petersburg – 27 September 1918 in Geneva) —  Diplomat, Norway researcher, founder of Saami collection of Russian Museum of Ethnography (Saint-Petersburg), Acting State Councillor.

Family 
Oscar Wiesel descended from the German-Austrian Wiesel family.

Father – Oskar Borisovich Wiesel (Wiesel Oscar Sigismund), was born in Russia in 1826, graduated from Prince Bezborodko's Gymnasium of Higher Learning in Nizhyn (currently Nizhyn Gogol State University), worked in the Russian Ministry of Finance, repeatedly visited Berlin, Amsterdam, and Paris on behalf of Tsars Alexander II and Alexander III, Acting State Councillor.

Mother – Marie Christine de Pointin was born in 1835. Her father Fransois de Pointin who had family roots from the French province of Picardy was born at Louis XVIII's court in exile in Warsaw. He was notable for building the silver iconostasis of the Kazan Cathedral (St. Petersburg) and was awarded the Order of St. Anna by graf Yuliy Pompeevich Litte (ital., Giulio Renato de Litta Visconti Arese).

Spouse - Marianna Pavlovna Kosagovskaya, daughter of Pavel Pavlovich Kosogovski, the governor of Vitebsk, Odessa, Kursk and Poltava.

Brother - Emil Anton Joseph Wiesel (1 March 1866, Saint Petersburg – 2 May 1943, Leningrad) – a painter, museum curator and a board member of the Imperial Academy of Arts, Russia (since 1914), organizer of international art exhibitions, councilor of Hermitage and Russian Museum and Legion of Honour holder. During soviet times he was an expert in Russian and Western fine arts and sculpture in the Glavnauka (central administrative board of science, science-artistic and museum institutions) museum department.

Diplomatic career
Oscar Wiesel graduated from The Second Saint-Petersburg Gymnasium in 1883 with honours (the silver medal). As a lawyer Oscar Wiesel represented Russia in European countries as an official of the Ministry of International Affairs.

From 1896 to 1901 he worked in Hamburg (Germany), as a vice-consul in ranks from Titular Councillor to Collegiate Assessor.

From 1901 to 1913 he worked in Hammerfest (Norway), as a consul, in ranks from Court Councillor to State Councillor.

From 1913 to 1916 he worked in Vevey and Geneva (Switzerland), as a general consul, in State Councillor rank.

In 1917 he was the general consul, Actual State Councillor, in Naples, Italy.

Oscar Wiesel's articles were published in official consulate reports at the beginning of the 20th century. These articles included information about Germany's non-European investments and colonial German policy (1900), reports on demonstrations in Northern Norway, rumours about “Russian threat”, and large cases of Norwegian treason to the benefit of Russia.
In 1909 The Second Department of the Ministry of Foreign Affairs published Wiesel's “The Compilation of Norwegian laws, Concerning Trade and Handicraft of Russian Citizens in Northern Norway”. The compilation was built-on 25 years of an old document of A.Teterman. Oscar Wiesel reformed the law part, added information about local taxes in Tromsø, Hammerfest and Vardø, included information about Norwegian metric system, and summarized the most important Norwegian laws, which could influence Russian citizens.

Norway Saami
During Wiesel's diplomatic years in Norway he was interested in researching the Sami people, a local ethnic group. In 1904 and 1914 Oscar Wiesel presented two collections to The Russian Museum of Ethnography, Saint Petersburg, of more than 100 pieces, which would become the core part of the Saami Collection of the museum. It included clothing, shoes, jewellery, household items, harnesses, fishing tackles, boats, etc. Some items had earlier been presented to Oscar Wiesel by the well-known Saami researcher Konstantin Shekoldin, the Archpriest of the Saint Boris and Gleb Church.

Year 1917
In the revolutionary 1917, Oscar Wiesel was appointed general consul in Naples. Oscar Wiesel was the member of The Union of Renaissance of Russia in cooperation with allies in Rome.

Literature
 Ves' Peterburg, adresnaja i spravochnaja kniga. 1894 god. A. S. Suvorin.
 Ves' Peterburg na 1896 god. A. S. Suvorin.
 Ves' Peterburg na 1910 god. 17-j god izdanija. A. S. Suvorin — izdatel'.
 Ves' Petrograd na 1913 god: Adresnaja i spravochnaja kniga g. Petrograda na... / red. A. P. Shashkovskij.
 Ves' Petrograd na 1914 god: Adresnaja i spravochnaja kniga g. Petrograda na... / red. A. P. Shashkovskij
 Kuropjatnik M. S. Kollekcii po jetnografii saamov // Materially po jetnografii. Narody Pribaltiki, Severo-Zapada, Srednego Povolzh'ja i Prmiural'ja. SPb.: Delovaja poligrafija
 Sbornik norvezhskih uzakonenij, kasajuwihsja torgovli i promyslov russkih poddannyh v Severnoj Norvegii / sost. O. Vizel'. SPb.: Tip. «T-va Hudozh. pechati», 1909. 66 s
 Sbornik konsul'skih donesenij. SPb., 1900.—Vyp. IV.

External links
 https://web.archive.org/web/20160304030040/https://2spbg.ru/vipusk1.php?id=1883
 http://landsmann.norge.ru/unknown/
 http://www.ethnology.ru/biobib/Result.php?fnc=7
 http://www.dissercat.com/content/germaniya-i-yugo-zapadnaya-afrika
 http://www.kunstkamera.ru/science/konferencii_i_seminary/2010/skandinavskie_chteniya_2010/

1864 births
1918 deaths
Diplomats from Saint Petersburg
Russian philanthropists
19th-century philanthropists